Possum Trot is an unincorporated community in Calhoun County, Alabama, United States.

Notable people
Rick Bragg, a journalist, was raised in Possum Trot.
Herman Clarence Nixon, a political scientist at Vanderbilt University and a member of the Southern Agrarians, was born in Possum Trot. In 1941, he wrote a book about his hometown, entitled Possum Trot: Rural Community, South.

References

Unincorporated communities in Calhoun County, Alabama
Unincorporated communities in Alabama